Russell A. Freedman (October 11, 1929 – March 16, 2018) was an American biographer and the author of nearly 50 books for young people. He may be known best for winning the 1988 Newbery Medal with his work Lincoln: A Photobiography.

Biography

Books were an important part of Freedman's life. His father worked for a company, and his mother worked in a bookstore.

He attended college first at San Jose State University

Later, Freedman worked as a reporter and editor for the Associated Press in San Francisco until the mid-1950s, when he took an advertising job in Manhattan. It was during this time that Freedman wrote his first novel after reading an article about a blind teenage boy who invented a Braille typewriter. The book, Teenagers Who Made History, was published in 1961. After its publication, Freedman quit his job and became a full-time writer.

As a writer of children's nonfiction, Freedman is often noted for his thorough research, and was praised for his "meticulous integration of words and images"

Freedman lived in New York City.

Selected works
 Cowboys of the Wild West, 1985
 Lincoln: A Photobiography, 1987
 Indian Chiefs, 1987
 Buffalo Hunt, 1988
 Franklin Delano Roosevelt, 1990
 The Wright Brothers: How They Invented the Airplane, 1991
 An Indian Winter, 1992
 Eleanor Roosevelt: A Life of Discovery, 1993
 Kids at Work: Lewis Hine and the Crusade Against Child Labor, 1994
 Immigrant Kids, 1995
 The Life and Death of Crazy Horse, 1996
 Out of Darkness: The Story of Louis Braille, 1997
 Martha Graham: A Dancer's Life, 1998
 Babe Didrikson Zaharias: The Making of a Champion, 1999
 Give Me Liberty: The Story of The Declaration of Independence, 2000
 Children of the Wild West, 2000
 Marian Anderson and the Struggle for Equal Rights, 2004
 100 People Who Changed America, 2004
 Children of the Great Depression, 2005
 The Adventures of Marco Polo, 2006
 Freedom Walkers: The Story of the Montgomery Bus Boycott, 2006
 Who Was First?: Discovering the Americas, 2007
 Washington at Valley Forge, 2008
 The War to End All Wars: World War I, 2010
 Lafayette and the American Revolution, 2010

Awards
In 1998 Freedman received the Laura Ingalls Wilder Medal from the professional children's librarians, which recognizes a living author or illustrator whose books, published in the United States, have made "a substantial and lasting contribution to literature for children". At the time it was awarded every three years.

He received one of the  2007 National Humanities Medals.

Freedman received the Carter G. Woodson Book Award in 2005 for The Voice that Challenged a Nation and in 2007 for Freedom Walkers.

Books
Lincoln: A Photobiography
Newbery Medal Winner – 1988
Fairfax County Public Library Booklist Jefferson Cup – 1988
William Allen White Children's Book Award Nominee – 1989–90
ALA Notable Book and Best Book for Young Adults

Eleanor Roosevelt: A Life of Discovery
Newbery Honor Book – 1994
Jane Addams Children's Book Award Honor Book – 1994
Boston Globe-Horn Book Award – 1994
Golden Kite Award – 1993
First Flora Stieglitz Straus Award – 1994
William Allen White Children's Book Award Nominee – 1995–96
Rebecca Caudill Young Reader's Book Award Nominee – 1996

The Wright Brothers: How They Invented the Airplane
Newbery Honor Book – 1992
Boston Globe-Horn Book Award – 1991
Golden Kite Award – 1991
Fairfax County Public Library Booklist Jefferson Cup – 1992
William Allen White Children's Book Award Nominee – 1993–94

Franklin Delano Roosevelt
Golden Kite Award – 1994
Orbis Pictus Award – 1991
Best of the Best: Children's Literature Award – 1993–94
Fairfax County Public Library Booklist Jefferson Cup – 1991
William Allen White Children's Book Award Nominee – 1992–93

Indian Chiefs
William Allen White Children's Book Award Nominee – 1989–90
ALA Notable Book and Best Book for Young Adults

Kids At Work: Lewis Hine and the Crusade Against Child Labor
Jane Addams Children's Book Award Winner – 1995
Golden Kite Award – 1994
Parents Choice Award – 1994
Orbis Pictus Honors Book – 1995
William Allen White Children's Book Award Nominee – 1996–97
Utah Children's Information Book Award Nominee – 1996–97

An Indian Winter
Western Heritage Award – 1995

Children of the Wild West
Boston Globe-Horn Book Award Nonfiction Honor Book – 1984

Buffalo Hunt
Carter G. Woodson Book Award – 1989

The Life and Death of Crazy Horse
Spur Award – Best Western Juvenile Fiction – 1996

Immigrant Kids
ALA Notable Book

Getting Born
New York Academy of Science Annual Children's Book Award Honorable Mention

References

External links

 

1929 births
2018 deaths
American non-fiction children's writers
20th-century American non-fiction writers
20th-century American biographers
21st-century American biographers
Carter G. Woodson Book Award winners
Laura Ingalls Wilder Medal winners
National Humanities Medal recipients
Robert F. Sibert Informational Book Medal winners
Newbery Medal winners
Newbery Honor winners